The 1944 United States presidential election in Illinois took place on November 7, 1944, as part of the 1944 United States presidential election. State voters chose 28 representatives, or electors, to the Electoral College, who voted for president and vice president.

Illinois was won by incumbent President Franklin D. Roosevelt (D–New York), running with Senator Harry S. Truman, with 51.52% of the popular vote, against Governor Thomas E. Dewey (R–New York), running with Governor John W. Bricker, with 48.05% of the popular vote.

Election information
The primaries and general elections coincided with those for other federal offices (Senate and House), as well as those for state offices.

Turnout
The total vote in the state-run primary elections (Democratic and Republican) was 646,993.

The total vote in the general election was 4,036,061.

Primaries
Both major parties held non-binding state-run preferential primaries on April 11.

Democratic

The 1944 Illinois Democratic presidential primary was held on April 11, 1944, in the U.S. state of Illinois as one of the Democratic Party's state primaries ahead of the 1944 presidential election.

The popular vote was a non-binding "beauty contest". Delegates were instead elected by direct votes by congressional district on delegate candidates.

Republican

The 1944 Illinois Republican presidential primary was held on April 11, 1944, in the U.S. state of Illinois as one of the Republican Party's state primaries ahead of the 1944 presidential election.

The preference vote was a "beauty contest". Delegates were instead selected by direct-vote in each congressional districts on delegate candidates.

Douglas MacArthur won the primary. Illinois businessman Riley A. Bender placed second, running as a favorite son.

General election

Results

Results by county

See also
 United States presidential elections in Illinois

References

Illinois
1944
1944 Illinois elections